Granada Nights is a 2021 coming-of-age film directed by Abid Khan starring Antonio Aakeel, Quintessa Swindell, Tábata Cerezo and Óscar Casas.

Plot 
A British tourist is stuck in Granada, Spain with a broken heart. Feeling lost and abandoned, he befriends a group of young foreigners and crashes into the heart of the international student scene. He pushes himself out of his comfort-zone and tries to restart his life but behind every corner is a reminder of his ex-girlfriend and his struggle to find closure. A love letter to Granada that mixes documentary with fiction to create a real and authentic heartfelt examination on the process of self-discovery.

Cast

References

External links 
 Official Website
 

British coming-of-age drama films
2021 films
2020s English-language films
2020s British films